The XIV Mediterranean Games, commonly known as the 2001 Mediterranean Games, were the 14th Mediterranean Games held in Tunis, Tunisia, from 2–15 September 2001, where 2,991 athletes (1,972 men and 1,019 women) from 23 countries participated. There were a total of 230 medal events from 23 different sports.

France won the most gold medals in the competition (40) while Italy had the greatest medal haul overall with 136 in total. Turkey, Spain and Greece rounded out the top five, shortly followed by the host country in sixth place.
Two disability events were incorporated into the athletics programme – there was a 1500 m wheelchair race for men and an 800 m for women.

Participating nations
The following is a list of nations that participated in the 2001 Mediterranean Games:

Sports

Medal table
The rankings sort by the number of gold medals earned by a country. The number of silvers is taken into consideration next and then the number of bronze. Equal ranking is given and they are listed alphabetically if after the above, countries are still tied. This follows the system used by the IOC, IAAF and BBC.

References

External links
International Mediterranean Games Committee
Results

 
M
M
M
Multi-sport events in Tunisia
Mediterranean Games by year
Sports competitions in Tunis
21st century in Tunis
September 2001 sports events in Africa